Aleksandar Tsolov Tsankov (June 29, 1879 – July 27, 1959) was a leading Bulgarian politician during the interwar period between the two world wars.

Biography
A professor of political economy at Sofia University from 1910 onwards, he took a leading role in the overthrow of the government of Aleksandar Stamboliyski in 1923 and was chosen to head the coalition that succeeded the deposed premier. The coup was able to succeed as the Bulgarian Communist Party took a neutral attitude towards the Agrarians rather than supporting Stamboliyski. He became Prime Minister of Bulgaria on 9 June that same year and continued in the role until 4 January 1926. During that period he was the leader of the Democratic Alliance. His premiership was marked by deep internal struggles with the Bulgarian Communist Party, which Tsankov repressed mercilessly, declaring martial law and outlawing the Communists in 1925 following an attempt on Tsar Boris's life and a bomb attack on the St Nedelya Cathedral. His actions led to Comintern denouncing the government as a "victorious Bulgarian fascist clique", whilst he later turned his attentions on the Agrarian Peoples Union, who were also suppressed, albeit less ferociously

A brief invasion by Greek troops followed and, although they did not stay long following condemnation by the League of Nations, the country was left crippled by debt and Tsankov was removed from office after failing to secure a loan for the country. By this point any support for Tsankov had dwindled as the people tired of his reign of terror.

After being removed from the political mainstream, Tsankov began to develop an admiration for Fascism and soon became a supporter of Adolf Hitler. In 1932, he set up his own National Social Movement largely in imitation of the Nazi Party. The movement proved fairly unimportant (although it did represent a further fragmentation of the governing coalition), lacking the support of Zveno and failing to secure Nazi approval, which was largely reserved for the Union of Bulgarian National Legions. Nonetheless, Tsankov was appointed by the Nazis in 1944 as prime minister of the Bulgarian government-in-exile set up in Germany in response to Kimon Georgiev's Fatherland Front government. This was despite the fact that Tsankov had been a signatory, one of only two from the right-wing opposition, to Dimitar Peshev's letter calling for an end to the deportation of Jews. After the Second World War Tsankov fled to Argentina and died in Belgrano, Buenos Aires in 1959.

See also
 White Terror
 Red Terror
 The incident at Petrich
 European interwar dictatorships

References

External links
 

 

1879 births
1959 deaths
Chairpersons of the National Assembly of Bulgaria
People from Oryahovo
Democratic Alliance (Bulgaria) politicians
National Social Movement (Bulgaria) politicians
Prime Ministers of Bulgaria
20th-century Bulgarian economists
Bulgarian fascists
Bulgarian anti-communists
Bulgarian emigrants to Argentina
Members of the National Assembly (Bulgaria)
Bulgarian collaborators with Nazi Germany
20th-century Bulgarian politicians
Rectors of Sofia University
Defence ministers of Bulgaria